was a private junior college in Fukusaki, Hyōgo, Japan.

History 
The college was founded in 1973 with two academic departments. It closed in 2001.

Courses offered
 Preschool education
 English communication

See also 
 List of junior colleges in Japan

References 

Educational institutions established in 1973
Japanese junior colleges
1973 establishments in Japan
Universities and colleges in Hyōgo Prefecture
Private universities and colleges in Japan
2001 disestablishments in Japan